St. Lawrence is a town in central Hand County, South Dakota, United States. The population was 164 at the 2020 census.

History
The first settlement at St. Lawrence was made in 1881. A post office has been in operation since 1882. The town was named after the Saint Lawrence River.

Geography
St. Lawrence is located at  (44.516955, -98.939025).

St. Lawrence has been assigned the ZIP code 57373 and the FIPS place code 57180.

Demographics

2010 census
As of the census of 2010, there were 198 people, 74 households, and 53 families residing in the town. The racial makeup of the town was 99.0% White, 0.5% Native American, and 0.5% from two or more races.

There were 74 households, of which 29.7% had children under the age of 18 living with them, 52.7% were married couples living together, 9.5% had a female householder with no husband present, 9.5% had a male householder with no wife present, and 28.4% were non-families. 18.9% of all households were made up of individuals, and 12.2% had someone living alone who was 65 years of age or older. The average household size was 2.68 and the average family size was 2.96.

The median age in the town was 42.6 years. 23.2% of residents were under the age of 18; 8.2% were between the ages of 18 and 24; 22.8% were from 25 to 44; 25.4% were from 45 to 64; and 20.7% were 65 years of age or older. The gender makeup of the town was 52.5% male and 47.5% female.

2000 census
As of the census of 2000, there were 210 people, 90 households, and 63 families residing in the town. The population density was 137.5 people per square mile (53.0/km2). There were 104 housing units at an average density of 68.1 per square mile (26.2/km2). The racial makeup of the town was 98.57% White, and 1.43% from two or more races. Hispanic or Latino of any race were 1.43% of the population.

There were 90 households, out of which 28.9% had children under the age of 18 living with them, 58.9% were married couples living together, 10.0% had a female householder with no husband present, and 28.9% were non-families. 25.6% of all households were made up of individuals, and 18.9% had someone living alone who was 65 years of age or older. The average household size was 2.33 and the average family size was 2.80.

In the town, the population was spread out, with 22.4% under the age of 18, 7.6% from 18 to 24, 21.9% from 25 to 44, 22.9% from 45 to 64, and 25.2% who were 65 years of age or older. The median age was 44 years. For every 100 females, there were 89.2 males. For every 100 females age 18 and over, there were 87.4 males.

The median income for a household in the town was $32,031, and the median income for a family was $34,583. Males had a median income of $20,357 versus $14,464 for females. The per capita income for the town was $13,300. About 9.0% of families and 13.1% of the population were below the poverty line, including 23.2% of those under the age of eighteen and 4.5% of those 65 or over.

See also
 List of towns in South Dakota

References

External links

Towns in Hand County, South Dakota
Towns in South Dakota